Moses Offutt (April 2, 1900 – September 23, 1967), also spelled "Offert", was an American Negro league pitcher in the 1920s.

A native of Auburn, Kentucky, Offutt played for the Indianapolis ABCs in 1925. In 20 recorded games, he posted a 4–3 record with a 6.98 ERA over 86.1 innings. Offutt died in Indianapolis, Indiana in 1967 at age 67.

References

External links
 and Seamheads

1900 births
1967 deaths
Indianapolis ABCs players
20th-century African-American sportspeople